Canada women's junior national goalball team is the women's junior national team of Canada.   Goalball is a team sport designed specifically for athletes with a vision impairment.  The teamtakes part in international competitions.

IBSA World Youth and Student Games

2007 USA 

The 2007 IBSA World Youth and Student Games were held in the United States.  The team was one of four teams participating, with the United States finishing first, Germany second, Russia third and Canada fourth.

2009 Colorado Springs 

The 2009 IBSA World Youth and Student Championships were held in Colorado Springs, Colorado, United States of America.  Canada fielded a youth team of:  
Ashlie Andrews (Penticton, BC)
Tiana Knight (Calgary, AB)
Stephannie Leach (London, ON)
Angel Lu-Lebel (Vancouver, BC)
Cassie Orgeles (St. Catherines, ON)
Tanya Peterson (Calgary, AB)

Carol Braul, head coach (Calgary, AB)
Cherie Lu, assistant coach (Vancouver, BC)

2011 Colorado Springs 

In 2011, the IBSA World Youth and Student Championships were held in Colorado Springs, Colorado, United States of America.  Canada fielded a youth girls team of: 
Ashlie Andrews (Penticton, BC)
Sophie Audet (Montréal, QC)
Sarah Hargraves (Brantford, ON)
Rima Kaddoura (Calgary, AB)
Tiana Knight (Calgary, AB)
Jillian MacSween (Brantford, ON / Halifax, NS)

Janice Dawson, high performance head coach (Calgary, AB)
Natalie Scott, assistant coach (Saskatoon, SK)
Mercedes Louro, physiotherapist (Calgary, AB)

Competitive history 

The table below contains individual game results for the team in international matches and competitions.

References

Goalball women's junior
National junior women's goalball teams
Canada at the Paralympics
Goalball in Canada
Goalball in the Americas